By-elections to the 5th Canadian Parliament were held to elect members of the House of Commons of Canada between the 1882 federal election and the 1887 federal election. The Conservative Party of Canada led a majority government for the 5th Canadian Parliament.

The list includes Ministerial by-elections which occurred due to the requirement that Members of Parliament recontest their seats upon being appointed to Cabinet. These by-elections were almost always uncontested. This requirement was abolished in 1931.

See also
List of federal by-elections in Canada

Sources
 Parliament of Canada–Elected in By-Elections 

1886 elections in Canada
1885 elections in Canada
1884 elections in Canada
1883 elections in Canada
1882 elections in Canada
05th